Candyman often refers to a person who performs candy making.

Candyman or Candy Man may also refer to:

Film, television and comics
 Candyman (character), villain of:
 Candyman (film series), a horror film franchise, consisting of four films:
 Candyman (1992 film)
 Candyman: Farewell to the Flesh (1995 film)
 Candyman: Day of the Dead (1999 film)
 Candyman (2021 film)
 Candyman (2010 film), a documentary about David Klein, originator of Jelly Belly jelly beans
 The Candy Man (film), a 1969 crime thriller film

Music

Albums
Candyman (album), by Steve Lukather
The Candy Man, by Mississippi John Hurt

Songs
 "Candyman" (Christina Aguilera song)
 "Candyman" (Ratcat song)
 "Candyman" (Siouxsie & the Banshees song)
 "The Candy Man", from the 1971 film Willy Wonka & the Chocolate Factory, notably covered by Sammy Davis, Jr.
 "Candy Man" (Roy Orbison song)
 "Candyman", by Primus
 "Candy Man", by Brown Eyed Girls
 "Candy Man", by Suzi Quatro from Main Attraction
 "Candyman", by Cornershop from When I Was Born for the 7th Time
 "Candyman", by Da Boy Tommy; an Ultratop 50 number-one hit of 2000 in Belgium
 "Candyman", by the Grateful Dead from American Beauty
 "Candyman", by Kahimi Karie from Kahimi Karie
 "Candy Man", by the Mary Jane Girls from Mary Jane Girls
 "Candyman", by Pitbull from The Boatlift
 "Candy Man", by Reverend Gary Davis; covered by Hot Tuna on First Pull Up, Then Pull Down
"Candy Man", by Donovan from Fairytale
 "Candyman", by Spacehog from Resident Alien
 "Candyman", by Vertical Horizon from Running on Ice
 "Candy Man Blues", by Mississippi John Hurt
 "The Candy Man", a 1988 song by American rock band Uncle Sam
 "Lollipop (Candyman)", by Aqua

Performers
 Candyman (rapper), an American rap artist
 Candyman (singer), a Cuban reggaeton singer

People

Nickname
 Zeca Baleiro, Brazilian singer and guitarist José Ribamar Coelho Santos (born 1966), nicknamed "Baleiro" ("Candyman")
 Kyle Busch (born 1985), American racing driver
 John Candelaria (born 1953), American baseball pitcher
 Tom Candiotti (born 1957), American baseball pitcher
 Dean Corll (1939–1973), American serial killer, rapist and pederast
 Sam Hyde (born 1985), American comedian
 Candy Maldonado (born 1960), American baseball player
 Ronald Clark O'Bryan (1944–1984), American murderer of his own son using poisoned candy
 Lamar Odom (born 1979), American basketball player

Other
 a ring name of Brad Armstrong (wrestler), American professional wrestler
 Candyman, a pseudonym for one of The Humble Guys, a cracking group for the IBM PC

Fictional characters
 Candyman (character), the antagonist of the Candyman franchise
 Officer Conrad "Candyman" Jones, a recurring police officer from the television series Third Watch
Greg Candyman, a character from the Cars film series
 Candyman, a character in Season 3 of the television series Fringe
 Candyman, in the comics series The Tick, a member of the supervillain team The Phalanx of Gloom
 Candy Man, the version of Popeye (an amalgamation of him and two other characters) in the 1961 film Sanctuary

See also
 Kandy Man, a robot in the Doctor Who universe
 The Candymen, an American band
 Candy (disambiguation)